Agios Athanasios may refer to:

Saint Athanasius of Alexandria
Agios Athanasios, Cyprus
 Agios Athanasios, Pella, a village in Pella regional unit, Greece
Agios Athanasios, Thessaloniki, a municipality in the Thessaloniki regional unit, Greece
Agios Athanasios, Xanthi, a village in the Xanthi regional unit, Greece
Agios Athanasios, a neighborhood of Serres, Macedonia, Greece